Scalable Urban Traffic Control (SURTRAC) is an adaptive traffic control system developed by researchers at the Robotics Institute, Carnegie Mellon University. SURTAC dynamically optimizes the control of traffic signals to improve traffic flow for both urban grids and corridors; optimization goals include less waiting, reduced traffic congestion, shorter trips, and less pollution. The core control engine combines schedule-driven intersection control with decentralized coordination mechanisms. Since June 2012, a pilot implementation of the SURTRAC system has been deployed on nine intersections in the East Liberty neighborhood of Pittsburgh, Pennsylvania. SURTRAC reduced travel times by more than 25% on average, and wait times were reduced by an average of 40%. A second phase of the pilot program for the Bakery Square district has been running since October 2013. In 2015, Rapid Flow Technologies was formed to commercialize the SURTRAC technology. The lead inventor of this technology, Dr. Xiao-Feng Xie, states that he has no association with and does not provide technical supports for this company.

Design
The SURTRAC system design has three characteristics. First, decision-making in SURTRAC proceeds in a decentralized manner. The decentralized control of individual intersections enables greater responsiveness to local real-time traffic conditions. Decentralization facilitates scalability by allowing the incremental addition of controlled intersections over time with little change to the existing adaptive network. It also reduces the possibility of a centralized computational bottleneck and avoids a single point of failure in the system.

A second characteristic of the SURTRAC design is an emphasis on real-time responsiveness to changing traffic conditions. SURTRAC adopts the real-time perspective of prior model-based intersection control methods which attempt to compute intersection control plans that optimize actual traffic inflows. By reformulating the optimization problem as a single machine scheduling problem, the core optimization algorithm termed a schedule-driven intersection control algorithm, is able to compute optimized intersection control plans over an extended horizon on a second-by-second basis.

A third characteristic of the SURTRAC design is to manage urban (grid-like) road networks, where there are multiple competing dominant flows that shift dynamically through the day, and where specific dominant flows cannot be predetermined (as in arterial or major crossroad applications). Urban networks also often have closely spaced intersections requiring tight coordination of the intersection controllers. The combination of competing for dominant flows and densely spaced intersections presents a challenge for all adaptive traffic control systems. SURTRAC determines dominant flows dynamically by continually communicating projected outflows to downstream neighbors. This information gives each intersection controller a more informed basis for locally balancing competing inflows while simultaneously promoting the establishment of larger "green corridors" when traffic flow circumstances warrant.

Criticism

The SURTRAC system uses closed-circuit television cameras to sense traffic conditions. Surveillance of public places with CCTV networks has been criticized as enabling totalitarian forms of government by undermining people's ability to move about anonymously. Images gathered by CCTV cameras can be analyzed by automatic number plate recognition software, permitting fully automated tracking of vehicles by the license plates (number plates) they carry. Similarly, facial recognition software can analyze such images to identify and track people by the shape of their faces. However, the type of video cameras used do not have sufficient resolution to detect license plates or recognize faces. 

It has been suggested that the benefits of traffic optimization have never been scientifically justified. It inherently favors motorized traffic over alternate modes such as pedestrians, bicyclists, and transit users and may promote more auto use.

See also
Traffic optimization
Adaptive traffic control
Smart traffic signals
Traffic light control and coordination
Intelligent transportation system
Transportation demand management
Automated planning and scheduling

Other adaptive traffic control systems 
Sydney Coordinated Adaptive Traffic System

References

External links
SURTRAC adaptive traffic signal control
Information about core algorithms and further developments

Traffic signals
Intelligent transportation systems
Traffic simulation